Sibongile Novuka (born 1 February 1998) is a South African rugby union player for the  in the Currie Cup. His regular position is fullback.

Novuka was named in the  squad for the 2021 Currie Cup Premier Division.

References

South African rugby union players
Living people
1998 births
Rugby union fullbacks
Blue Bulls players
Border Bulldogs players
Bulls (rugby union) players